Geraldo Rocha Pereira (born 16 March 1994), commonly known as Geraldo, is a Brazilian professional footballer who plays for Tarumã in the second division of the Campeonato Amazonense. He previously played for Náutico in the Campeonato Pernambucano.

Born in Manaus, Geraldo began playing futsal for Rio Negro at the age of seven.

References

External links
Geraldo at playmakerstats.com (English version of ogol.com.br)

1994 births
Living people
Brazilian footballers
Clube Náutico Capibaribe players
Campeonato Pernambucano players
Association football midfielders
People from Manaus
Sportspeople from Amazonas (Brazilian state)